Active matter is matter composed of large numbers of active "agents", each of which consumes energy in order to move or to exert mechanical forces. Such systems are intrinsically out of thermal equilibrium. Unlike thermal systems relaxing towards equilibrium and systems with boundary conditions imposing steady currents, active matter systems break time reversal symmetry because energy is being continually dissipated by the individual constituents. Most examples of active matter are biological in origin and span all the scales of the living, from bacteria and self-organising bio-polymers such as microtubules and actin (both of which are part of the cytoskeleton of living cells), to schools of fish and flocks of birds. However, a great deal of current experimental work is devoted to synthetic systems such as artificial self-propelled particles. Active matter is a relatively new material classification in soft matter:  the most extensively studied model, the Vicsek model, dates from 1995.

Research in active matter combines analytical techniques, numerical simulations and experiments. Notable analytical approaches include hydrodynamics, kinetic theory, and non-equilibrium statistical physics. Numerical studies mainly involve self-propelled-particles models, making use of agent-based models such as molecular dynamics  algorithms or lattice-gas models, as well as computational studies of hydrodynamic equations of active fluids. Experiments on biological systems extend over a wide range of scales, including animal groups (e.g., bird flocks, mammalian herds, fish schools and insect swarms), bacterial colonies, cellular tissues (e.g. epithelial tissue layers, cancer growth and embryogenesis), cytoskeleton components (e.g., in vitro motility assays, actin-myosin networks and molecular-motor driven filaments). Experiments on synthetic systems include self-propelled colloids (e.g., phoretically propelled particles), driven granular matter (e.g. vibrated monolayers), swarming robots and Quinke rotators.

Concepts in Active matter
 Active gels
 Dense active matter
 Collective motion
 Collective animal behavior
 Collective cell migration
 Motility induced phase separation
 Schooling, flocking and swarming
 Collective motion
 Active stress 
 Disordered hyperuniformity

Active matter systems
 Biological tissues
 Subcellular and cell mechanics
 Crowd behaviour
 Self-propelled particles and colloids

References

Soft matter
Crowds